Lopinavir is an antiretroviral of the protease inhibitor class. It is used against HIV infections as a fixed-dose combination with another protease inhibitor, ritonavir (lopinavir/ritonavir).

It was patented in 1995 and approved for medical use in 2000.

Side effects
Side effects, interactions, and contraindications have only been evaluated in the drug combination lopinavir/ritonavir.

Pharmacology
Lopinavir is highly bound to plasma proteins (98–99%).

Reports are contradictory regarding lopinavir penetration into the cerebrospinal fluid (CSF).  Anecdotal reports state that lopinavir cannot be detected in the CSF; however, a study of paired CSF-plasma samples from 26 patients receiving lopinavir/ritonavir found lopinavir CSF levels above the IC50 in 77% of samples.

Research
A 2014 study indicates that lopinavir is effective against the human papilloma virus (HPV). The study used the equivalent of one tablet twice a day applied topically to the cervices of women with high-grade and low-grade precancerous conditions.  After three months of treatment, 82.6% of the women who had high-grade disease had normal cervical conditions, confirmed by smears and biopsies. Lopinavir has been shown to impair protein synthesis via AMP-activated protein kinase (AMPK) and eEF2 kinase (eEF2K) activation, a mechanism that is similar to the antiviral effect of protein phosphatase 1 inhibitors.

Lopinavir was found to inhibit MERS-CoV replication in the low-micromolar range in cell cultures. In 2020, lopinavir/ritonavir was found not to work in severe COVID-19. In this trial the medication was started typically around 13 days after the start of symptoms.

References

External links 
 

CYP3A4 inhibitors
Secondary alcohols
HIV protease inhibitors
Phenol ethers
AbbVie brands
Pyrimidones
Ureas
World Health Organization essential medicines